Mount Josephine, may refer to:
 Mount Josephine (Antarctica)
 Mount Josephine (British Columbia)
 Mount Josephine (Minnesota)
 Mount Josephine (California)
 Mount Josephine (Washington)